Crater Mountain is a  mountain summit located west of the crest of the Sierra Nevada mountain range, in Fresno County of northern California, United States. Other nearby peaks include Mount Wynne,  to the northeast, and Mount Cedric Wright,  to the southeast. Crater Mountain ranks as the 186th highest summit in California. Topographic relief is significant as the west aspect rises  in less than one mile. The approach to this remote peak is made via the John Muir Trail which passes below the east aspect of the mountain. The first ascent of the summit was made July 19, 1922, by W. H. Ink, Meyers Butte, Frank Baxter, and Captain Wallace. This mountain has no crater as the name implies.

Climate
According to the Köppen climate classification system, Crater Mountain is located in an alpine climate zone. Most weather fronts originate in the Pacific Ocean, and travel east toward the Sierra Nevada mountains. As fronts approach, they are forced upward by the peaks, causing them to drop their moisture in the form of rain or snowfall onto the range (orographic lift). Precipitation runoff from the mountain drains to Woods Creek which is a tributary of the South Fork Kings River.

See also

 List of mountain peaks of California

References

External links

 Weather forecast: Crater Mountain
 Crater Mountain photo: Flickr

Mountains of Fresno County, California
Mountains of Kings Canyon National Park
North American 3000 m summits
Mountains of Northern California
Sierra Nevada (United States)